A referendum on whether Antonio López de Santa Anna should remain President., and if not, who should replace him, was held in Mexico on 1 December 1854. The proposal was approved by 99.07% of voters. On 11 December Santa Anna ordered reprisal measures against those who had voted no. On 2 January 1855 he declared that the country had confirmed his position in office. He was subsequently overthrown on 8 December that year.

Background
Santa Anna took over as President for a year in 1853. On taking office on 20 April, he abolished the 1824 constitution and ruled as a dictator. On 16 December he declared himself President for Life. After the Plan of Ayutla was proclaimed in March 1854, aimed at reinstituting the 1824 constitution, a revolt started. As it spread, the decision was made to hold a referendum. 

However, the press was only allowed to announce the referendum on the day it was held. Voting was not secret and voters had to name and sign their ballots.

Results

The second question was:

References

1854 referendums
1854 in Mexico
Referendums in Mexico
December 1854 events